Jäätyneitä lauluja (Finnish for "Frozen Songs")is the second solo album by Ismo Alanko, released in 1993. The album has electronic music influence, making heavy use of drum loops and modern studio technology.

Jäätyneitä lauluja is the first Ismo Alanko album that has Alanko's lyrics printed on the album sleeve. Alanko has said that the lyrics were printed on the demand of cover artist Stefan Lindfors.

Track listing 
All tracks by Ismo Alanko, except where noted.
 "Pornografiaa"—5:47
 "Laboratorion lapset" (Alanko, Mitro) -- 4:58
 "Kuolemalla on monet kasvot" (Alanko, Izmo) -- 5:22
 "Extaasiin" (Alanko, Izmo, Mitro, Riku Mattila) -- 4:42
 "Demokratiaa (mutta vain tietyillä ehdoilla)" (Alanko, Mitro) -- 5:45
 "Rakkautta ja hölynpölyä"—3:57
 "Kolme pientä sanaa"—3:54
 "Autolounas huoltamon tapaan" (Alanko, Mattila) -- 4:52
 "Miljonäärien yö"—5:02

Personnel 
 Ismo Alanko -- vocals, guitar, sequencer
 Ilkka Alanko -- backing vocals
 Veeti—backing vocals
 Anssi Nykänen -- drum loops
 Janne Haavisto—drum loops
 Riku Mattila - guitar
 Izmo -- synthesizer

References 

1993 albums
Ismo Alanko albums